Gnamptogenys is a genus of ants in the subfamily Ectatomminae. The genus has a wide distribution. It is known to occur in the Nearctic, Neotropic, Indomalayan and Australasian realms.

Species

Gnamptogenys acuminata (Emery, 1896)
Gnamptogenys acuta (Brown, 1956)
Gnamptogenys albiclava (Mann, 1919)
Gnamptogenys alfaroi (Emery, 1894)
Gnamptogenys ammophila Lattke, 1990
Gnamptogenys andersoni Lattke, Fernández, Arias-Penna, Palacio, MacKay & MacKay, 2008
Gnamptogenys andina Lattke, 1995
Gnamptogenys annulata (Mayr, 1887)
Gnamptogenys arcuata (Santschi, 1929)
Gnamptogenys aspera Morgan, Mackay & Pacheco, 2003
Gnamptogenys aterrima (Mann, 1921)
Gnamptogenys atrata Lattke, 2004
Gnamptogenys auricula Lattke, Fernández, Arias-Penna, Palacio, MacKay & MacKay, 2008
Gnamptogenys avus Camacho, Franco & Feitosa, 2020
Gnamptogenys banksi (Wheeler, 1930)
Gnamptogenys bicolor (Emery, 1889)
Gnamptogenys biloba Lattke, 2004
Gnamptogenys binghamii (Forel, 1900)
Gnamptogenys biquetra Lattke, 2002
Gnamptogenys biroi (Emery, 1901)
Gnamptogenys bispinosa (Emery, 1890)
Gnamptogenys bisulca Kempf & Brown, 1968
Gnamptogenys boliviensis Lattke, 1995
Gnamptogenys bruchi (Santschi, 1922)
Gnamptogenys brunnea Lattke, 1995
†Gnamptogenys brunoi Lattke, 2002
Gnamptogenys bufonis (Mann, 1926)
Gnamptogenys bulbopila Lattke, 2004
Gnamptogenys caelata Kempf, 1967
†Gnamptogenys casca Lattke, 2002
Gnamptogenys chapmani Brown, 1958
Gnamptogenys coccina Zhou, 2001
Gnamptogenys concinna (Smith, 1858)
Gnamptogenys continua (Mayr, 1887)
Gnamptogenys costata (Emery, 1889)
Gnamptogenys coxalis (Roger, 1860)
Gnamptogenys crassicornis (Forel, 1912)
Gnamptogenys crenaticeps (Mann, 1919)
Gnamptogenys cribrata (Emery, 1900)
Gnamptogenys cuneiforma Lattke, 1995
Gnamptogenys curvoclypeata Lattke, 1990
Gnamptogenys delta Lattke, 2004
Gnamptogenys dentihumera Chen, Lattke & Zhou, 2020
Gnamptogenys dichotoma Lattke, Fernández, Arias-Penna, Palacio, MacKay & MacKay, 2008
Gnamptogenys ejuncida Lattke, 1995
Gnamptogenys enodis Lattke, Fernández & Palacio, 2004
Gnamptogenys epinotalis (Emery, 1897)
Gnamptogenys ericae (Forel, 1912)
†Gnamptogenys europaea (Mayr, 1868)
Gnamptogenys extra Lattke, 1995
Gnamptogenys falcaria Lattke, 2002
Gnamptogenys falcifera Kempf, 1967
Gnamptogenys fernandezi Lattke, 1990
Gnamptogenys fieldi Lattke, 1990
Gnamptogenys fistulosa Lattke, 2004
Gnamptogenys flava Pacheco, MacKay & Morgan, 2004
Gnamptogenys fontana Lattke, 2004
Gnamptogenys gabata Lattke, 2004
Gnamptogenys gastrodeia Lattke, 2004
Gnamptogenys gentryi Lattke, 1995
Gnamptogenys gracilis (Santschi, 1929)
Gnamptogenys grammodes Brown, 1958
Gnamptogenys haenschi (Emery, 1902)
Gnamptogenys hartmani (Wheeler, 1915)
Gnamptogenys haytiana (Wheeler & Mann, 1914)
Gnamptogenys helisa Lattke, 2004
Gnamptogenys horni (Santschi, 1929)
Gnamptogenys hyalina Lattke, 2004
Gnamptogenys ilimani Lattke, 1995
Gnamptogenys ingeborgae Brown, 1993
Gnamptogenys insularis Lattke, 2002
Gnamptogenys interrupta (Mayr, 1887)
Gnamptogenys kempfi Lenko, 1964
Gnamptogenys lacunosa Lattke, 2004
Gnamptogenys laevior (Forel, 1905)
Gnamptogenys lanei Kempf, 1960
Gnamptogenys laticephala Lattke, 1995
Gnamptogenys latistriata Camacho, Franco & Feitosa, 2020
Gnamptogenys lavra Lattke, 2002
Gnamptogenys leiolabia Lattke, 2004
Gnamptogenys lenis Camacho, Franco & Feitosa, 2020
†Gnamptogenys levinates Baroni Urbani, 1980
Gnamptogenys lineolata Brown, 1993
Gnamptogenys lucaris Kempf, 1968
Gnamptogenys lucida (Mann, 1919)
Gnamptogenys luzonensis (Wheeler, 1929)
Gnamptogenys macretes Brown, 1958
Gnamptogenys major (Emery, 1901)
Gnamptogenys malaensis (Mann, 1919)
Gnamptogenys mecotyle Brown, 1958
Gnamptogenys mediatrix Brown, 1958
Gnamptogenys meghalaya Lattke, 2004
Gnamptogenys menadensis (Mayr, 1887)
Gnamptogenys menozzii (Borgmeier, 1928)
Gnamptogenys mina (Brown, 1956)
Gnamptogenys minuta (Emery, 1896)
Gnamptogenys moelleri (Forel, 1912)
Gnamptogenys mordax (Smith, 1858)
Gnamptogenys nana Kempf, 1960
Gnamptogenys nanlingensis Chen, Lattke & Zhou, 2017
Gnamptogenys nigrivitrea Lattke, 1995
Gnamptogenys niuguinensis Lattke, 2004
Gnamptogenys ortostoma Lattke, 2004
Gnamptogenys palamala Lattke, 2004
Gnamptogenys panda (Brown, 1948)
Gnamptogenys paso Lattke, 2004
Gnamptogenys perspicax Kempf & Brown, 1970
Gnamptogenys pertusa Lattke, 2004
Gnamptogenys petiscapa Lattke, 1990
Gnamptogenys piei Dias & Lattke, 2019
Gnamptogenys pilosa Lattke, 1995
Gnamptogenys pittieri Lattke, 1990
Gnamptogenys pleurodon (Emery, 1896)
Gnamptogenys polytreta Lattke, 2004
Gnamptogenys porcata (Emery, 1896)
Gnamptogenys posteropsis (Gregg, 1951)
Gnamptogenys preciosa Lattke, 2004
†Gnamptogenys pristina Baroni Urbani, 1980
Gnamptogenys quadrutinodules Chen, Lattke & Zhou, 2017
Gnamptogenys rastrata (Mayr, 1866)
Gnamptogenys regularis Mayr, 1870
Gnamptogenys reichenspergeri (Santschi, 1929)
Gnamptogenys relicta (Mann, 1916)
Gnamptogenys rimulosa (Roger, 1861)
†Gnamptogenys rohdendorfi Dlussky, 2009
Gnamptogenys rugodens Lattke, 2004
Gnamptogenys rumba Lattke, 2002
Gnamptogenys scalpta Lattke, 2004
Gnamptogenys schmitti (Forel, 1901)
Gnamptogenys semiferox Brown, 1958
Gnamptogenys siapensis Lattke, 1995
Gnamptogenys sichuanensis Lattke, 2004
Gnamptogenys sila Lattke, 2004
Gnamptogenys simulans (Emery, 1896)
Gnamptogenys sinensis Wu & Xiao, 1987
Gnamptogenys solomonensis Lattke, 2004
Gnamptogenys spiralis (Karavaiev, 1925)
Gnamptogenys stellae Lattke, 1995
Gnamptogenys striatula Mayr, 1884
Gnamptogenys strigata (Norton, 1868)
Gnamptogenys striolata (Borgmeier, 1957)
Gnamptogenys sulcata (Smith, 1858)
Gnamptogenys taivanensis (Wheeler, 1929)
Gnamptogenys toronates Lattke, 2004
Gnamptogenys tortuolosa (Smith, 1858)
Gnamptogenys transversa Lattke, 1995
Gnamptogenys treta Lattke, 2004
Gnamptogenys triangularis (Mayr, 1887)
Gnamptogenys volcano Lattke, 1995
Gnamptogenys vriesi Brandão & Lattke, 1990
Gnamptogenys wallacei (Donisthorpe, 1932)
Gnamptogenys wheeleri (Santschi, 1929)
Gnamptogenys wilsoni Lattke, Fernández & Palacio, 2007

References

External links

Ectatomminae
Ant genera